Viksjöfors is a locality situated in Ovanåker Municipality, Gävleborg County, Sweden with 244 inhabitants in 2010.

References 

Populated places in Ovanåker Municipality
Hälsingland